Columbia City Paper was a free alternative newspaper in Columbia, South Carolina featuring investigative articles, political commentary, humor, music, arts and entertainment coverage. Founded in August 2005 by Paul F. Blake the paper is based in Columbia, South Carolina. Columbia City Paper is distributed throughout South Carolina's capital city and its suburbs. Its circulation is 15,000 every other week.
According to  The State newspaper, "The publication continues to establish its voice, and possibly most important, people still talk about it."
The newspaper was sued multiple times, most notably in 2007 as the case's punitive damages were reversed in appeals court in September, 2011. The newspaper continued to publish four years after aforementioned lawsuit. The publisher relocated to Vietnam in December, 2010 and decided to end publication with its 200th issue in September 2011, just prior to its six-year anniversary.

References

 "Columbia City Paper is main source for Center for Human Rights report"

 Content from City Paper has appeared on Drudge Report

 ABC affiliate covers opposition to newspaper in Columbia, South Carolina

 News about City Paper on the Association of Alternative Newsweekly site

 Associated Press reports on City Paper publishing Muhammad cartoon

 USC's Gamecock covers Columbia City Paper

 "USC's Gamecock covers Columbia City Paper story"

 City Paper helps raise money for Special Olympics

 "Columbia City Paper at Democratic Talk Radio.com"

 "Columbia City Paper editorial on Michael Phelps scandal at RawStory.com"

Columbia City Paper also covers  Music and the  Arts every issue as well as a variety of environmental issues.

External links
 Columbia City Paper (official site)
 City Paper Blog
 City Paper Myspace
 Editor of Columbia alternative paper resigns after arson fire at home January 3, 2006.

Alternative weekly newspapers published in the United States
Mass media in Columbia, South Carolina
Newspapers published in South Carolina
Publications established in 2005
Publications disestablished in 2011